Villers-Campsart is a commune in the Somme department in Hauts-de-France in northern France.

Geography
The commune is situated 22(35 km) miles west of Amiens, on the D29 road.

Population

See also
Communes of the Somme department

References

Communes of Somme (department)